Chirolaelaps is a genus of mites in the family Laelapidae.

Species
 Chirolaelaps mystacinae A. C. G. Heath, D. M. Bishop & M. J. Daniel, 1987

References

Laelapidae